Ina Mayhew is a New York-based production designer known for her work with directors Spike Lee and Tyler Perry.

Biography 
She is the daughter of artist Dorothy Zuccarini and painter Richard Mayhew. She studied fine arts at SUNY Purchase and traveled in Africa before completing a technical theater degree at the Parsons School of Design. She was among the 683 individuals invited to join the Motion Picture Academy of Arts and Sciences in 2016.

References

External links 
 

State University of New York at Purchase alumni
Parsons School of Design alumni
American production designers
Women production designers
Living people
Year of birth missing (living people)